Nadapuram is a census town and a special grade Panchayath located in Kozhikode District of Kerala, coming under Nadapuram assembly constituency. It is in North Malabar region of Kerala, India; spread over an area of 20.44 km2

Awards
Nadapuram won the best panchayat award of Kozhikode district seven consecutive years under the leadership of president, Sooppy Narikkatteri.  In 2015, the panchayath administration received the best performing Grama Panchayath award at state level and all India level among more than 265000 grama panchayats in India.

History
In history Nadapuram was the place which lies in between Kuttipuram Kovilakam and Kadathanad palace. The derivation of the name Nadapuram is widely known through 2 names like Nagapuram and Nadapuram (land of Music). Nadapuram is the place which is well known as part of the ballad of Kadathanad and is known all over Kerala. This land witnessed the padayottam of Thacholi Othenan and Unniyarcha in olden times. Art forms like Dafmuttu, Aravanamuttu, Poorakkali and Kolkkali were nourished in this place.

In his book "Malayala Rajyam Charithrathodu Chernna Bhoomisathram" Hermen Gundert states about Nadapuram as the place which is two miles north east to Kuttipuram and there is a Mazjid and a market mainly concentrated on Pepper business.

Kuttipuram was part of the famous Kurumbanad Taluk and was famous for its martial arts. Now the remnant of Kuttipuram Kovilakam is only a pond with dilapidated pavement and covered with waterweed. Unniyarcha defeated ‘Jonakans’ using a wet cloth dipped in this pond.

In the older times Nadapuram was well known for its secular nature and was famous as a centre for Islamic teaching. Significant marks for its secularism can be noted from this place like Kallachi where the Kallachi Avolam road is named in the name of the Great ruler Tipu Sulthan.

Nadapuram has also the awaking as part of National movement. The urge for freedom made a group of people led by Sri. Appukurup to try to make an explosion at the Nadapuram Munsif court using bomb which was under the then British rulers. The Nadapuram Munsif court was formed in the year 1910 Nadapuram has a lot of freedom fighting saga by donating its freedom warriors like Sri Rairukurup, P Krishinan Nambiar, Edavalath Kanaran master and Chingonth Kunhiraman Nair for the fight they had made for their country and made their land proud.

Demographics

As of 2011 India census, Nadapuram has a population of 40,230. Hindu and Mappilas (Muslims) are major religions. Males constitute 47% of the population and females 53%. Hindu:47.52%,Muslim:52.21%,Christian:0.19% and Others:0.07%. Nadapuram has an average literacy rate of 92.64%, higher than the national average of 74.4%. Male literacy is around 96.34% while female literacy rate is 89.49%. In Nadapuram, 13.18% of the population is under 6 years of age. The language Malayalam is used widely as in the rest of Kerala.

Economy

Most of the people are working outside India, particularly in the Persian Gulf area. The main income of the locality is based on these NRIs. Nadapuram is greatly influenced by the luxuries of Gulf regions. One can find magnificent houses with modern facilities, which reflect the wealth of the local people.

Politics
Nadapuram grama panchayath  is strong hold of  Muslim league(IUML).it is a part of  
Nadapuram assembly constituency& Vadakara (Lok Sabha constituency).nadapuram is famous in rest of Kerala on the basis of political violence between cpim and indian union Muslim league.

Nadapuram Assembly Constituency
Nadapuram Assembly constituency consists of the Panchayats Vanimel, Edacheri, Thuneri, Chekkiad, Valayam, Narippatta, Kayakkodi, Kavilumpara, Maruthonkara  and Nadapuram.

E K Vijayan is the MLA of Nadapuram.
In the 2016 Assembly elections he defeated Adv. Praveen Kumar, of INC at a margin of 4759 votes. The present MP (member of parliament) Binoy Viswam represented Nadapuram constituency in 2001 & 2006.

History of Nadapuram Assembly Constituency

Geography

Geographically, Nadapuram is situated about 14 km to the north east of Vadakara Town, approximately 21 km to the south east of Thalassery Town. The Panchayat lies by the side of a river known by different names as Vishnumangalam river, Mahe(Mayyazhi) river or Vanimel river.

Landmarks 

Nadapuram Masjid, This Mosque played an important role in the history of Nadapuram, as it nourishes the tradition and culture for over 100 years. In the present time also this mosque is an important landmark to Nadapuram. Nadapuram also has Judicial First Class Magistrate Court & Munsiff Court, the office of the DYSP, the office of the Circle Inspector of Police, Police Station, Police control Room, Traffic Unit, Gov't Taluk Hospital, Gov't College, Mini Civil Station, PWD Rest house, Sub Treasury, the BSNL divisional office, Fire & Rescue Station, AEO office, Sub Registrar office, Excise Range office, Land Tribunal office, KSBCDC sub district office and the KSEB Division office, Sub division office & Section office.

Law and Order
The correct date of opening and Govt. notification is not available. The station has the jurisdiction over the panchayaths of Nadapuram, Thuneri, Purameri and parts of Edacheri, and Ayancheri.

The border police stations are headquartered at Edacheri, Vadakara, Valayam and Kuttiady.

Nadapuram is also headquarters of one among the four subdivisions of Kozhikode Rural District Police. The police stations at Nadapuram, Valayam, Kuttiady, and Thottilpalam comes under jurisdiction of Nadapuram subdivision of district police. Nadapuram Traffic unit & Control room also come under the Subdivision.

Jurisdictional courts of Nadapuram Station
 Judicial First Class Magistrate Court Nadapuram
 Munsiff Court Nadapuram
 Pocso Fast Track Special Court Nadapuram

Transportation

Road 
Nadapuram town is 63 km away from Kozhikode City. SH 38 (Aka - Airport Road) Passes through Nadapuram. Nadapuram Town connects to other parts of India through Vatakara city on the west and Kuttiady town on the east. National highway No.66 passes through Vatakara and the northern stretch connects to Mangalore, Goa and Mumbai. The southern stretch connects to Cochin and Trivandrum. The eastern Highway going through Kuttiady connects to Mananthavady, Mysore and Bangalore.
Regular bus services serve Vatakara, Thalassery, Kuttiady, Panoor and Thottilpalam. Hilly regions like Kaiveli, Kumbala Chola, Valayam, Chuzhali, Kallunira, Vanimel, Vilangad are connected to Nadapuram through Bus route. KSRTC Bus service are available to Mananthavady, Sulthan Bathery, Kalpetta, Mysore & Bangalore.

Railway 
There is no direct railway line that connects Nadapuram with other cities. Nearest stations are at Vatakara(16 kilometres), Nadapuram Road (11 kilometres) and Mahe (18 kilometres). Nadapuram can reach Vatakara or Nadapuram Road by train and then proceed by road through Orkkatteri & Edacheri.

Air 
The air gateway to Nadapuram is the Kannur International Airport (KIAL) located at Mattannur, which is about 38 km  and handles both domestic and international flights. Calicut International Airport is 88 km away from Nadapuram

Educational Organizations
There are many schools in Nadapuram including state syllabus and CBSE syllabus. Nadapuram town and bus stand can be found crowded with school/college students. The list of schools can be found in Educational institutions in Vatakara. In May 2014 a prestigious indoor stadium is inaugurated at Nadapuram.

In Book, Film, and Television
The song "Nadapurm palliyile" from 1978 Indian Malayalam-language historical drama film Thacholi Ambu is well known all over Kerala. The music was composed by K. Raghavan and the lyrics were written by Yusufali Kechery.  Famous writer Akbar Kakkattil wrote a book named "Nadapuram'' which is a collection of 16 short stories.

Climate
Nadapuram has a tropical climate. During most months of the year, there is significant rainfall in Nadapuram. There is only a short dry season. This climate is considered to be Am according to the Köppen-Geiger climate classification. The average annual temperature in Nadapuram is 27.2 °C. In a year, the average rainfall is 3697 mm. The temperatures are highest on average in April, at around 29.5 °C. In July, the average temperature is 25.7 °C. It is the lowest average temperature of the whole year. The variation in the precipitation between the driest and wettest months is 1111 mm. The average temperatures vary during the year by 3.8 °C.

Notable people
 A.K. Balan, Minister of Kerala
 Gani Nigam, Indian Footballer
 Abdulla Aboobacker, Indian Athlete

References

External links

Vatakara area